Easa Shareef is a Maldivian film director, actor, screen-writer, editor and lyricist.

Career
In 1993, Shareef collaborated with Yoosuf Rafeeu for his tragedy drama film Vaudhu (1993) which narrates the separation of a happy couple due to the societal differences. The following year, he directed and starred in the critically acclaimed film Zakham (1994) where he played the supportive brother of a young girl who has been forced to marry out of her will. In 1996, he directed the film Edhuvas Hingajje which follows the love triangle of a devoted wife, a reckless husband and his short tempered mistress. This was followed by Yoosuf Rafeeu's award winning film Haqqu which revolves around a man who is forced to marry a woman against his will, and stars Mariyam Nisha, Reeko Moosa Manik and Mariyam Shakeela in lead roles. The film received positive reviews from critics.

In 1997, Shareef released the most successful film of his career, the horror film Fathis Handhuvaru (1997), which stars Reeko Moosa Manik and Niuma Mohamed in lead roles. The film narrates the story of a married young woman who falls in love with a ghost. It received both critical and commercial success, where it is celebrated as one of the most successful Maldivian film with the highest number of shows screened upon release. The same year, he released the drama film Emme Fahu Dhuvas (1997), starring Reeko Moosa Manik, Niuma Mohamed, Hassan Afeef, and Mariyam Nazima. The following year, he collaborated with Arifa Ibrahim to co-write the drama film Dhauvaa (1998), which was an unofficial remake of Deepak Sareen's Bollywood film Aaina (1993).

In 2000, he directed another horror film 2000 Vana Ufan Dhuvas which follows the affair and revenge of a twins. The following year, he collaborated with Aishath Ali Manik for her romantic drama film Hiiy Edhenee, to adapt  Dharmesh Darshan's romantic film Dhadkan (2000), along with Ahmed Nimal, which was well received by critics and audience. In the film, he starred as a ruthless father who forces his daughter to cut off the ties with an underpreviledged man.

In 2003, Easa Shareef directed the horror film, titled Ginihila (2003), which stars Ali Seezan, Mariyam Nisha, Niuma Mohamed and Reeko Moosa Manik in lead roles. The film is an unofficial remake of Vikram Bhatt's Indian horror film Raaz (2002), featuring Bipasha Basu, Dino Morea, Malini Sharma, and Ashutosh Rana, which itself is an unofficial adaptation of What Lies Beneath. Apart from that, Shareef directed a five episode television series, Dheewanaa Hiyy which focuses on the reunion of a long lost family through conflicts and disputes.

Shareef's action-adventure film Hatharu Udhares was released in 2004 which stars Ali Seezan, Reeko Moosa Manik, Ali Ahmed and Mariyam Manike in lead roles and marketed as the first adventurous Maldivian film. Upon release, it received mixed to negative reviews from critics, where several critics lauded the post production of the film and the directors were criticized for releasing a "half-baked" film.

Apart from direction, acting, screenwriting and editing, Shareef is notable as a lyricist for his work in several films and studio albums. At the 7th Gaumee Film Awards, Shareef received a nomination as the Best Lyricist for his song "Inthizaarey Othee Hiyy Edheythee" from the film Kuhveriakee Kaakuhey? (2011).

Filmography

As an actor

Other work

Discography

As a lyricist

Accolades

References 

Living people
People from Malé
21st-century Maldivian male actors
Maldivian male film actors
Maldivian film directors
Year of birth missing (living people)